The 34th Producers Guild of America Awards (also known as 2023 Producers Guild Awards or 2023 PGA Awards), honoring the best film and television producers of 2022, were held at the Beverly Hilton in Beverly Hills, California on February 25, 2023. The nominations in the documentary category were announced on December 12, 2022, the nominees in the sports, children's and short-form categories were announced on December 16, 2022, and the remaining nominations for film and television were announced on January 12, 2023. The nominations for the PGA Innovation Award were announced on February 10, 2023.

Winners and nominees

Film

Television

PGA Innovation Award

David O. Selznick Achievement Award in Theatrical Motion Pictures
 Tom Cruise

Milestone Award
 Michael De Luca and Pamela Abdy

Norman Lear Achievement Award in Television
 Mindy Kaling

Stanley Kramer Award
 Till

References

External links
 PGA Awards website

 2022
P
2022 television awards
Producers Guild of America Awards